Harrison Township is one of twelve townships in Boone County, Indiana. As of the 2010 census, its population was 704 and it contained 288 housing units.

Geography

Unincorporated towns
 Milledgeville
 New Brunswick

Adjacent townships
 Center (northeast)
 Jackson (west)
 Perry (east)
 Middle Township, Hendricks County (south)
 Union Township, Hendricks County (southwest)

Major highways
  Indiana State Road 39

Cemeteries
The township contains two cemeteries: Mount Union and Poplar Grove.

References
 
 United States Census Bureau cartographic boundary files

External links

 Indiana Township Association
 United Township Association of Indiana

Townships in Boone County, Indiana
Townships in Indiana